Types of Wood is the second full-length album released by the American three piece band Whirlwind Heat. It featured model Susan Eldridge on the cover.

Track listing

References

2006 albums
Whirlwind Heat albums